DDF may refer to:

Biology and medicine
 Digestive Disorders Foundation, a British medical research charity
(N,N-dimethyl-amino)-benzenediazonium-fluoroborate, a photoaffinity probe that competes with acetylcholine for receptor binding 
 Sulfoxone, an anti-leprosy drug sold under “DDF” brand

Technology
 Digital distribution frame, a device which terminates digital data streams, allowing arbitrary interconnections to be made
 4,4'-Dinitro-3,3'-diazenofuroxan, an experimental high explosive
 Disk Data Format, a structure describing how data is formatted across disks in a RAID group

Other uses
 Demographic Development Fund, Georgian think thank
 Drop Dead Fred, a 1991 fantasy comedy film
 Dubai Duty Free, a duty-free retailer